Whiskey Island is an island in northern Lake Michigan, part of the Beaver Island archipelago.  It is about ⅜ of a square mile (1.0 km2.) in size.  Although unininhabited, it is politically part of St. James Township, Charlevoix County, Michigan

The island is also called Whisky Island.

A shoal off the island was the site of the loss of the schooner Chandler J. Wells on 20 November 1884.  She was carrying lumber from Manistique, Michigan to Buffalo, New York.

References

Islands of Charlevoix County, Michigan
Islands of Lake Michigan in Michigan
Uninhabited islands of Michigan